The Duchy of Wolgast-Stolp, also known as the Duchy of Wolgast and Stolp, and the Duchy of Wołogoszcz and Słupsk, was a feudal duchy in Western Pomerania within the Holy Roman Empire. Its capital was Wolgast. It was ruled by the Griffin dynasty. It existed in the eras of Late Middle Ages and the Early modern period, from 1532 to 1625.

The state was formed on 21 November 1532, in the partition of the Duchy of Pomerania, with duke Philip I, as its first ruler. It existed until 1625, when, under the rule of duke Bogislaw XIV, it was incorporated into the unified Duchy of Pomerania.

List of rulers 
 Philip I (1532–1560)
 Bogislaw XIII, Ernst Ludwig, John Frederick, and Barnim X (1567–1569)
 Ernst Ludwig (1569–1592)
 Philipp Julius (1592–1625)

See also 
 Pomerania-Wolgast
 Pomerania-Stolp
 Pomerania-Schlawe

Citations

Notes

References

Bibliography 
Rodowód książąt pomorskich by E. Rymar. Szczecin. Pomeranian Library. 2005. ISBN 83-87879-50-9, OCLC 69296056. (Polish)
Encyklopedia Szczecina, vol. 1. A-O. Szczecin. University of Szczecin. 1999. p. 336. ISBN 83-87341-45-2.

Former countries in Europe
Former monarchies of Europe
Duchies of the Holy Roman Empire
Wolgast Stolp
16th-century establishments in Europe
17th-century disestablishments in Europe
16th century in the Holy Roman Empire
17th century in the Holy Roman Empire
States and territories established in 1532
States and territories disestablished in 1625